Vladimir Milosavac (born 1 December 1985), is a Serbian futsal player who plays for Marbo Intermezzo and the Serbia national futsal team.

References

External links
UEFA profile

1985 births
Living people
Serbian men's futsal players